WYSX (96.7 FM) is a radio station broadcasting a contemporary hit radio format branded as "96.7 Yes FM" licensed to Morristown, New York, United States. The station is owned by the Stephens Media Group. WYSX's studios are located in Ogdensburg, New York while its transmitter is located near Stone Church Rd and County Rd 6.

History
The station went on the air as WXED on February 14, 1992. On May 18, 1992, the station changed its call sign to WNYP-FM; another callsign change occurred on March 15, 1993, to WNCQ-FM; once more on June 23, 2004, to WPAC; & finally on July 2, 2004, to the current WYSX.

The station was previously owned by Martz Communications Group, and was acquired by Stephens as of February 1, 2008.

References

External links

YSX
Radio stations established in 1992
Contemporary hit radio stations in the United States